Georges-René Le Peley de Pléville (29 June 1726 in Granville – 2 October 1805 in Paris) was the governor of the port of Marseilles, a French admiral, minister for the navy and the colonies from 15 July 1797 to 27 April 1798, a senator, a knight of the Order of St Louis and the Order of Cincinnatus, and one of the first Grand officiers of the Légion d'honneur.

Life

Origins and youth 
His father was Hervé Le Peley, seigneur de Pléville, a captain in the merchant navy, and his mother was the daughter of the seigneur du Saussey in the parish of Lingreville.  Thus de Pléville was attracted to the sea and ships early in his life. Orphaned whilst very young, he ran away from the collège at Coutances to get himself engaged on a ship to Newfoundland in 1738.  His uncle - intending him for the priesthood - asked the ship's captain to put de Pléville off life at sea. His first voyage as a pilotin was therefore particularly hard. At Newfoundland an old friend of his father welcomed him and treated him with more understanding. He thus went on many cod fishing voyages on different ships. He became an ensign from 1740 on the Ville de Québec, but objected to having been sent to the brig (ship's prison cell), which he deemed unjust. He deserted and fled whilst Ville de Québec was anchored on the coast of Canada. He walked alone for 50 days through the Canadian forest, meeting native tribes, before finally arriving in Quebec, where he was welcomed by a family that took pity on him. He embarked on another ship under a pseudonym as a helmsman and for the following years continued to work in Newfoundland.

War of the Austrian Succession 
He entered the gardes de la marine but was too poor to remain there, so he was taken on by a small privateer sailing from Granville, the Françoise du Lac, as lieutenant. Some hours after leaving port, this boat was met in the lee of Jersey by two English privateers and crushed between their cannons' cross-fire.  de Pléville was wounded in this 6 hour long battle, losing his right leg and finally being captured.  Welcomed to Falmouth like a son by the family of an Admiralty functionary, he was cared for there and learned English until he was exchanged for an English prisoner.  He then served in the French Royal Navy as lieutenant de frégate on the 46-gun Argonaute, commanded by Tilly Le Pelley, another uncle, then on the ship Mercure, which was part of the squadron under the orders of the duc d'Anville in 1746 to recapture Cape Breton Island.  This squadron was met on its return from Chebucto by Admiral George Anson and in the ensuing First battle of Cape Finisterre a cannonball carried away de Pléville's wooden leg (de Pléville joked to his captain "That cannonball was mistaken - it only made work for the carpenter." or, in the original French, "Le boulet s'est trompé -  il n'a donné de besogne qu'au charpentier") and he was once again taken prisoner.

On his release, he started serving on another privateer.  He was second officer on the Comte de Noailles, on which he was yet again taken prisoner, though he managed to escape shortly before the end of the war.  He then became second officer on a smuggling vessel working along the coast of England then, as captain, for four years again on a Newfoundland fishing vessel.

In 1757 Georges Pléville Le Pelley married Marie Ursule de Rambaud in Marseilles, and the couple had four children.  Marie Ursule was the daughter of Jean Rambaud (a privateer captain, ship-owner and foreign merchant), with the marriage thus making de Pléville brother-in-law to Agathe de Rambaud.

Seven Years' War 
His ship, Brillant, was requisitioned as a troop transport for the 1756 expedition to Menorca and then for the operations on Corsica.  He commanded the privateer corvette Colibri, belonging to his father-in-law, informing the French navy of the movements of English vessels.  Having been in many close combats, he and the Colibri were integrated into the Clue squadron in 1758 at Martinique.

From 1758 to 1762, he commanded a small ship of the French Navy, the Hirondelle, with which he seized three British East India Company ships.  During one of these battles, he again lost his wooden leg.  Health problems forced him to take up posts on land in the following years, including lieutenant de vaisseau and capitaine of the port of Martinique from 1763, writing a treatise on masts and making improvements to the roads on the Antilles.

Governor of the port of Marseilles 

Returning to France, he was taken on by the harbour of Marseilles as its harbour-captain.  The English frigate Alarm, battered by a storm in the evening of 1 May 1770, ran aground on the coast of Provence amongst boulders, and was in imminent danger of breaking up.  This event gave Pléville the chance to deploy his nautical knowledge, his self-control and his courage.  Told of the danger the ship was in, he quickly mustered the harbour pilots, surrounded himself with the bravest sailors he could find, and at their head rushed to the relief of the English, while confronting the perils of the sea in the darkest time of a stormy night.  He moored himself to a grelin, slid alongside the boulders, reached on board the frigate with his wooden leg, and took command of it.  The ship had already almost heeled over many times, and began to run aground.  Pléville ordered a manoeuvre that got it afloat again and brought it into harbour at Marseilles.  This frigate was commanded by captain John Jervis, who later became a British admiral and was awarded the title of Earl of St Vincent for destroying the Spanish fleet at the cape of that name in 1797.  de Pléville's fearless devotion and dignity was appreciated in England, with the lords of the Admiralty giving him a glowing testimony on behalf of the British government and commanding captain Jervis to return to Marseilles in the frigate Alarm to give de Pléville a very valuable present and a letter expressing their sentiments on his inspiring conduct.  The letter ran thus:

The present was a piece of silverware in the form of an urn, on which were engraved dolphins and other maritime attributes, with a model of the Alarm, and a richly engraved lid surmounted by a triton.  Remarkable in its elegance of form and high level of finish and workmanship, this vase bore the English coat of arms, and had the following inscription, intended to preserve the memory of the event which had merited this superb present:

Thinking that he could not receive a gift from a foreign sovereign, de Pléville only accepted the urn after having been duly authorised to do so by the king of France.  Jervis was also extremely grateful to de Pléville, and eager for the chance to reward him.  He wrote to his sister from HMS Alarm, anchored at Mahón on 27 December 1770:

Ten years later, de Pléville's devotion to the safety of the Alarm gained a different but no less honourable reward, when his son - a young naval officer - was captured on board a frigate at the end of a battle in 1780 and taken to England.  There, the British Admiralty sent him back to France without requiring a prisoner-exchange, after having authorised him to choose three other French naval officers to go with him.

American War of Independence 
During the American War of Independence, he acted as lieutenant de vaisseau in d'Estaing's squadron from 1778 on board the flagship, the Languedoc.  He took part in the whole campaign and in many different battles.  d'Estaing entrusted him with gaining supplies and reprovisioning the fleet, and was astonished by his unselfishness, for those usually given that kind of mission would not let such a chance for self-enrichment pass them by.  He was promoted to capitaine de vaisseau at the admiral's intervention, but returned to France with him and re-assumed his old duties at the port of Marseilles.  There, he also gave positive comparison to his contemporaries in his exemplary honesty (rare at that time), living only on his official wage and not on embezzled funds, despite having a large family to support.

Georges René Le Peley de Pléville was a member of the Society of the Cincinnati from France.

Under the French Revolution 
He adopted the principles of the French Revolution, as did most of the officers who had served in America, but in moderation.  He was the treasurer of a revolutionaries' club at Marseilles.  He sailed to Avignon, where he disembarked, sabre in hand, to receive his orders.  During the Reign of Terror, he was sent to take command of a division charged with escorting a resupply convoy to Tunis that had not yet got through, replacing Jean Gaspard Vence after he was accused of treason.  On arrival, he realised that Vence was really in difficulties and had not failed in his duty in the slightest.  Ignoring his orders, he kept Vence in his command and simply offered him his help.  This brought de Pléville some difficulties with the authorities, but thanks to him Vence's reputation would be fully rescued.

He fulfilled the functions of a Minister of the Navy for two years, and then reorganised the naval forces at Ancona and Corfu.  He, Letourneur and Maret were the three plenipotentiaries sent to Lille in summer 1797 for (fruitless) peace negotiations with Britain.  During his stay in Lille, on 19 July 1797, the Directory named him Minister of the Navy and the Colonies, to replace Admiral Laurent Truguet.  Also in 1797 he was made a rear admiral.

As minister, he was once again remarked upon for his unselfishness, honesty and scrupulousness in a regime particularly marked by general corruption among the political and administrative elites.  He was made vice admiral in April 1798, but dismissed from the ministry due to his disapproval of the expedition to Egypt, for which he was convinced the navy did not have the means.  He was vindicated in this by the fleet's disastrous defeat by Nelson at the battle of Aboukir Bay.

At the age of 72, he commanded the French naval forces in the Mediterranean for a short while, then retired to Paris.  The Consulate named him a senator in 1799, and the Empire brought him the honour of commander of the Légion d’honneur on its creation, though he died soon after the honour was bestowed.

Likenesses 
His portrait may be seen in the musée du Vieux Granville, whilst his statue dominates Granville's port.  Also, a bust of him may be seen at the palace of Versailles.

Notes

External links
 Society of the Cincinnati
 American Revolution Institute

Sources 

  "Georges-René Pléville Le Pelley", in Charles Mullié, Biographie des célébrités militaires des armées de terre et de mer de 1789 à 1850, 1852
  Guy de Rambaud, Pour l’amour du Dauphin, Anovi 2005, biography of Agathe de Rambaud
  Guy de Rambaud, Les Rambaud, mille ans d'histoire (manuscrit)
  https://web.archive.org/web/20071029043803/http://www.histoire-empire.org/persos/le_pelley.htm
  Monique Le Pelley-Fonteny : Itinéraire d’un marin granvillais : Georges-René Pléville Le Pelley (1726–1805). Neptunia Vol. 55, Paris, 2000.
  His memoirs : Mémoires d’un marin granvillais, collectif, Collection patrimoine, Les Cahiers Culturels de la Manche, Maison du Département 50008 St-Lô 
  Georges Fleury : lauréat du Prix Henri Queffélec 2000, pour son ouvrage Le Corsaire - Pléville Le Pelley - 1726-1805, éd. Flammarion
  Monique Le Pelley-Fonteny, Gilles Désiré dit Gosset, Antoine Reffuveille, Rémy Villand : Les amiraux granvillais, catalogue de l'exposition 2006–2007. Conseil Général de la Manche. 
  Hubert Granier, contre-amiral (2è S.), Marins de France au combat 1715-1789, Editions France Empire, Paris, 1995
  Jean Marc Van Hille, les vicissitudes d'un marin provençal, Jean Gaspard Vence, 1747-1808, Service Historique de la Marine, Paris.
 　https://web.archive.org/web/20080330220033/http://www.1789-1799.org/articles/rambaud/agathe_de_rambaud.htm

1726 births
1805 deaths
People from Granville, Manche
French Navy admirals
French military personnel of the Seven Years' War
French Republican military leaders of the French Revolutionary Wars
Ministers of Marine and the Colonies
Members of the Sénat conservateur
French amputees
Grand Officiers of the Légion d'honneur
French naval commanders of the Napoleonic Wars
Royalty and nobility with disabilities